Mauser Model 1935 may refer to:
 The Belgian Mauser Model 1935
 The Brazilian Mauser Model 1935, a Mauser Model 1908 variant made in Germany
 The German Karabiner 98k
 The Peruvian Model 1935, FN Model 24/30 vairant made in Belgium